Tillandsia subg. Viridantha is a subgenus of the genus Tillandsia.

Species
Species accepted by Encyclopedia of Bromeliads as of October 2022:

Tillandsia atroviridipetala 
Tillandsia balsasensis 
Tillandsia boqueronensis 
Tillandsia caballosensis 
Tillandsia chusgonensis 
Tillandsia curvifolia 
Tillandsia grandispica 
Tillandsia hernandezii 
Tillandsia heteromorpha 
Tillandsia ignesiae 
Tillandsia lepidosepala 
Tillandsia lithophila 
Tillandsia malyi 
Tillandsia mauryana 
Tillandsia oblivata 
Tillandsia pachycaulis 
Tillandsia plumosa 
Tillandsia reducta 
Tillandsia rupicola 
Tillandsia rzedowskiana 
Tillandsia secundifolia 
Tillandsia stellifera 
Tillandsia tectorum 
Tillandsia teloloapanensis 
Tillandsia tomekii 
Tillandsia tortilis 
Tillandsia yagulensis 
Tillandsia zamudioi

References

Plant subgenera
Viridantha